Keith Duncan (born February 19, 1998) is an American football placekicker. He played college football for the Iowa Hawkeyes.

Early life and high school
Duncan grew up in Weddington, North Carolina and attended Weddington High School. He set state records for field goals in a season (22) and total field goals (51) and consecutive extra points made (104).

College career
Duncan was named Iowa's kicker going into his freshman year, making nine field goals on 11 attempts and converting 38 of 39 extra point attempts. Duncan lost the starting kicker job going into the next season to Miguel Recinos and redshirted his sophomore season and also did not see any action the following year. He was named the Hawkeyes starting kicker again going into his redshirt junior year. Duncan was named first team All-Big Ten Conference and the Conference Kicker of the Year after making a Big Ten record 29 of 34 field goal attempts. Duncan was also named a consensus first team All-American and was a finalist for the Lou Groza Award. Duncan was named to the Big Ten Network's All-Decade team for the 2010s.

References

External links
Iowa Hawkeyes bio

Living people
American football placekickers
Iowa Hawkeyes football players
Players of American football from North Carolina
People from Weddington, North Carolina
1998 births
All-American college football players